Dongdaemun Baseball Stadium was a multi-purpose stadium in Seoul, South Korea. It was used mostly for baseball games. The stadium held 26,874 people. The stadium was built in 1959 and was demolished in 2007, along with the Dongdaemun Stadium. It has been replaced by the Dongdaemun Design Plaza, which opened in 2014. A new baseball stadium, the Gocheok Sky Dome, was completed in the Guro district in 2015, and serves as a replacement to Dongdaemun Baseball Stadium.

See also
Jamsil Baseball Stadium
Mokdong Baseball Stadium
Gocheok Sky Dome

References

1959 establishments in South Korea
2008 disestablishments in South Korea
Defunct baseball venues
Demolished buildings and structures in South Korea
Multi-purpose stadiums in South Korea
Sports venues completed in 1959
Sports venues demolished in 2008
Sports venues in Seoul
Defunct sports venues in South Korea
Baseball venues in South Korea
History of baseball in South Korea